Greg Robinson (born August 7, 1969) is a former professional American football player who played running back for three seasons for the St. Louis Rams and the Los Angeles Raiders. He led the Raiders in rushing in 1993, gaining 591 yards in 12 games, before suffering a serious knee injury against the Buffalo Bills. He sat out the rest of the 1993 season and all of 1994 before coming back with the Rams. Robinson never fully recovered from his knee injury and retired after the 1998 season.

During his career Robinson rushed for 890 yards and 2 touchdowns. He also added 18 receptions for 160 yards.

Robinson's best games as a professional occurred during three games in November 1993. Over the course of three weeks he rushed for 70 yards against the Chicago Bears, 90 yards against the Kansas City Chiefs, and 89 yards against the San Diego Chargers.

Greg Robinson's lone touchdown as a Los Angeles Raider occurred during the teams week one game against the Minnesota Vikings. His only touchdown as a St. Louis Ram occurred during a 1996 game against the Atlanta Falcons.

References

External links
NFL.com player page

1969 births
Living people
People from Grenada, Mississippi
American football running backs
Los Angeles Raiders players
St. Louis Rams players
Louisiana–Monroe Warhawks football players
Holmes Bulldogs football players